Yasmiany Pedroso (born 5 August 1984) is a Cuban athlete competing in the heptathlon. She has won several medals at the regional level.

Competition record

Personal bests
200 metres – 25.10 (0.0 m/s) (Havana 2012)
800 metres – 2:23.44 (Ponce 2007)
100 metres hurdles – 13.88 (-0.6 m/s) (Rio de Janeiro 2007)
High jump – 1.84 (Havana 2006)
Long jump – 6.13 (+1.2) (Caracas 2007)
Shot put – 15.61 (Havana 2012)
Javelin throw – 48.88 (Havana 2012)
Heptathlon – 5942 (Caracas 2007)

References

1984 births
Living people
Cuban heptathletes
Cuban female athletes
Pan American Games medalists in athletics (track and field)
Athletes (track and field) at the 2011 Pan American Games
Athletes (track and field) at the 2007 Pan American Games
Pan American Games silver medalists for Cuba
Medalists at the 2011 Pan American Games